Dave Swanton is a retired American football coach. He served as the head coach of Stonehill College in Easton, Massachusetts, compiling a record of 14–10–2.

After retiring from collegiate coaching, he served as the headmaster at Braintree High School in Braintree, Massachusetts.

Head coaching record

References

Year of birth missing (living people)
Living people
Stonehill Skyhawks football coaches
Bridgewater State University alumni